The 1971–72 Weber State Wildcats men's basketball team represented Weber State College during the 1971–72 NCAA University Division basketball season. Members of the Big Sky Conference, the Wildcats were led by first-year head coach Gene Visscher and played their home games on campus at Wildcat Gym in Ogden, Utah.

The conference tournament was four years away, and for the fifth consecutive season, Weber State won the Big Sky title and played in the 25-team NCAA tournament. In the West regional, the Wildcats defeated #12 Hawaii  in the first round in Pocatello, Idaho, and advanced to the Sweet Sixteen in Provo. Weber fell to eventual champion UCLA by 32 points, then dropped the third-place game to San Francisco.

Senior forward Bob Davis was named to the all-conference team; senior forward Jon Knoble and junior guard Brady Small were on the second team.

Postseason results

|-
!colspan=9 style=| NCAA tournament

References

External links
Sports Reference – Weber State Wildcats: 1971–72 basketball season
2015–16 Media Guide: 1971–72 season

Weber State Wildcats men's basketball seasons
Weber State
Weber State